Georgina Emma Buchanan Earl  (born 10 October 1978 in Hastings, New Zealand), better known under her maiden name Georgina Evers-Swindell, is a former New Zealand rower. She competed in the double sculls with her identical twin sister Caroline Evers-Swindell, and is a double Olympic gold medallist, having won at Athens in 2004 and Beijing in 2008.  In November 2005 she and her sister were named Rowing Female Crew of the Year by the International Rowing Federation (FISA), and in 2016 they became the first New Zealanders to be awarded the federation's highest award, the Thomas Keller Medal. She is 180 cm tall, weighs 80 kg and currently resides in Napier, New Zealand.

In 2001, she won silver at the World Championships in both the double and quadruple sculls. Together with her sister she won gold at both the 2002 and 2003 World Rowing Championships in the double sculls.

In 2002, she broke the indoor 2000 m rowing world record, recording a time of 6 minutes and 28.5 seconds beating the previous record by 2.1 seconds.

In the 2005 New Year Honours, she was made an Officer of the New Zealand Order of Merit, for services to rowing.

At the 2008 Summer Olympics in Beijing, she and her sister won gold medals in the women's double sculls, beating the German double by 1/100 of a second, 7:07.32 versus 7:07.33. This was the first time in history that the women's double scull title had successfully been defended. She and her sister announced their retirement from rowing in October 2008.

In December 2008, she and her sister won the Lonsdale Cup which is awarded by the New Zealand Olympic Committee to the athlete/s who make the most outstanding contribution to an Olympic sport. They previously won the cup in 2003.

In January 2009, Evers-Swindell married Sam Earl, himself a former New Zealand rower and son of Olympic gold medallist rower Joe Earl. Since then, she has styled herself Georgina Earl.

Evers-Swindell is a member of the Sports Tribunal of New Zealand.

References

External links

|-

1978 births
Living people
New Zealand twins
New Zealand female rowers
Rowers at the 2004 Summer Olympics
Rowers at the 2008 Summer Olympics
Olympic gold medalists for New Zealand in rowing
Waldorf school alumni
Sportspeople from Hastings, New Zealand
Twin sportspeople
Officers of the New Zealand Order of Merit
Medalists at the 2008 Summer Olympics
Medalists at the 2004 Summer Olympics
World Rowing Championships medalists for New Zealand
Thomas Keller Medal recipients
21st-century New Zealand women